Pierre Stéphen (1890–1980) was a French film actor.

Selected filmography

 Irène (1920)
 La dette (1920)
 Gigolette (1921)
 La brèche d'enfer (1923) - Le Vicomte de La Cardière
 Le double piège (1923)
 Le crime d'une sainte (1923) - Florimond
 Les deux baisers (1924)
 L'aventurier (1924) - André Varèze
 The Abbot Constantine (1925) - Paul de Lavardens
 The Woman with Closed Eyes (1926) - Le jeune homme
 La Girl aux mains fines (1926)
 Les mufles (1929) - Nicolas Jantet
 La ronde des heures (1931) - Monsieur de Mirsolle
 Un bouquet de flirts (1931)
 Azaïs (1932) - Félix Borneret
 I by Day, You by Night (1932) - Max Meyer
 The Porter from Maxim's (1933) - Octave
 A Love Story (1933) - Binder, musicien
 Moi et l'impératrice (1933)
 Rien que des mensonges (1933) - Paul Daubreuil
 Cette vieille canaille (1933) - Le professeur d'histoire / Ein Hauslehrer
 Ces messieurs de la Santé (1934) - Hector
 Arlette et ses papas (1934) - Lecouturier
 L'école des contribuables (1934) - Giroux
 Le billet de mille (1935) - Un comédien
 Compartiment de dames seules (1935) - Philippe Thomery
 La sonnette d'alarme (1935) - Gaston
 Paris Camargue (1935) - L'ami de Gérard
 La famille Pont-Biquet (1935) - Toupance
 La rosière des Halles (1935) - Victor Varel
 You Can't Fool Antoinette (1936) - Stanislas de Varini
 L'école des journalistes (1936) - Fernand Dubreuil
 Oeil de lynx, détective (1936) - Jérôme
 Au son des guitares (1936) - Pierre
 The House Opposite (1937) - Mouche
 L'amour veille (1937) - Ernest Vernet
 Rendez-vous Champs-Elysées (1937) - Pierre
 Monsieur Bégonia (1937) - Poussier
 Un meurtre a été commis (1938) - Le Furet
 Les femmes collantes (1938) - Hippolyte Loupiot
 Clodoche (1938) - Jacques
 Three Waltzes (1938) - Le journaliste
 Une java (1939) - Le Tordu
 Raphaël le tatoué (1939) - Max Corner
 His Uncle from Normandy (1939) - Ambroise, le clerc de notaire
 Grey contre X (1940) - Jean Cartenet
 Strange Suzy (1941) - Joseph
 Nadia la femme traquée (1942) - Pierre Loiselet
 Mélodie pour toi (1942) - Ferdiand
 A Woman in the Night (1943) - Campolli
 La troisième dalle (1946) - Orfray
 Plume la poule (1947)
 The Woman I Murdered (1948) - Raoul Le Hardouin
 Le sorcier du ciel (1949) - Le maire des Garets
 L'extravagante Théodora (1950) - Octave Leprieur
 Cartouche, King of Paris (1950) - Lignières
 J'y suis... j'y reste (1953) - Baron Hubert du Mont-Vermeil
 Mon curé champion du régiment (1956) - Le baron Honoré de Villetaneuse
 The Adventures of Arsène Lupin (1957) - Le bijoutier Clérissy
 Cinq millions comptant (1957) - Le représentant des parfums 'Volubilis'
 Sénéchal the Magnificent (1957) - Un joueur de poker
 Fric-frac en dentelles (1957) - Jim Courenju
 Comme un cheveu sur la soupe (1957) - Le commissaire de police
 L'amour est en jeu (1957)
 Trois marins en bordée (1957) - Marquis de Botarin
 Ni vu, ni connu (1958) - Le procureur
 Vice Squad (1959) - (uncredited)
 Tendre et violente Elisabeth (1960) - Le médecin
 La salamandre d'or (1962)

References

Bibliography 
 Goble, Alan. The Complete Index to Literary Sources in Film. Walter de Gruyter, 1999.

External links 
 

1890 births
1980 deaths
French male stage actors
French male film actors
French male silent film actors
20th-century French male actors
Male actors from Paris